Oedemera flavipes is a very common species of beetle of the family Oedemeridae, subfamily Oedemerinae.

These beetles are present in most of Europe and in the Near East.

Their body is gray-green, dark green or coppery, while forelegs are yellow (hence the Latin word flavipes) or reddish.  The male of Oedemera flavipes, as in most Oedemera species, possesses the hind femora very swollen, whereas in female the femora are thin.

They are a common prey of the checkered beetle, Trichodes alvearius.

The larvae develop in stems of herbaceous plants or in decaying branches.

Similar species
Oedemera nobilis

References
 
 Vazquez, X. A. 2002. European Fauna of Oedemeridae - Argania editio, Barcelona, 179 pp.

Oedemeridae
Beetles of Asia
Beetles of Europe
Beetles described in 1792
Taxa named by Johan Christian Fabricius